Méracq is a commune in the Pyrénées-Atlantiques département in south-western France.

Name
Historically, Méracq has been recorded as Meirac (13th century), Honerac (1538), Lo Merac (1546) and Louméracq (1863).

Its name in Gascon is L'Oumerac.

See also
Communes of the Pyrénées-Atlantiques department

References

Communes of Pyrénées-Atlantiques